Kilmarie or Kilmaree, (Gaelic: cill =' church or cell'; marie from St. Maolrubha) is a village in the Isle of Skye, Scotland.  Its most notable feature is the village church and graveyard.  The graveyard has a significant number of tombstones from highland clans, in particular Clan MacKinnon.  Nearby is Kilmarie House, former residence of Jethro Tull member Ian Anderson.

It is also the point of embarkation from Route B8083 to Dun Ringill ruin.

References

Populated places in the Isle of Skye
Clan Mackinnon